Wiltrud is a feminine German given name. Notable people with the name include:

Wiltrud Drexel (born 1950), Austrian alpine skier
Wiltrud Probst (born 1969), German tennis player
Wiltrud Urselmann (born 1942), German swimmer

German feminine given names